Joëlle Huillier, born 6 October 1948 in Lyon, was a
deputy in the 14th legislature of the French Fifth Republic for Isère's 10th constituency from 2012 to 2017 as a member of the Socialist Party.
She was the first woman national assembly deputy from the north of Isère.

She is a City Councilor for Villefontaine, and was Deputy Mayor from March 19, 2001, to March 16, 2008.

References

External links
 Her page on the site of the National Assembly

Deputies of the 14th National Assembly of the French Fifth Republic
1948 births
Living people
21st-century French women politicians